Alfredo Castillero Hoyos is a Panamanian political scientist, human rights activist, and professor. He was a member of the United Nations's Human Rights Committee and ran for the ombudsman office of Panama.

Alfredo Castillero Hoyos graduated at the University of Warwick where he obtained a master's degree in political studied in 1993. He then went on to complete post-graduate studies in the methodology of social sciences and a doctorate in political studies, both at the University of Portsmouth in 1999.

References

Living people
Panamanian activists
Panamanian political scientists
Alumni of the University of Warwick
Alumni of the University of Portsmouth
Year of birth missing (living people)